West 117th–Madison is a station on the RTA Red Line in Cleveland, Ohio. It is located on the border between Cleveland and Lakewood.
 
The station is located on the southeast corner of Madison Avenue and West 117th Street. The border between Cleveland and Lakewood runs down West 117th Street. As originally constructed, it included a bus loop adjacent to West 117th Street and a parking lot to the east. The station has undergone renovation and reconstruction, making it ADA accessible.

In 2006–2007, the station recently underwent rehabilitation, and the renovated station was opened on October 16, 2007. Upon rededication, the name of the station was to be changed to Highland Square at West 117th Street, but the West 117th–Madison name had been retained with Highland Square name attached. Highland Square refers to a neighborhood name used in the 19th century. As of 2017, the Highland name has been removed.

History

The station was the original western terminus of the CTS Rapid Transit when the west side portion of the line opened on August 14, 1955. The line was extended 1.84 miles west to Triskett Station on November 15, 1958.

In late 2005, RTA began rebuilding the station, which was expected to take two years. After the $4.7-million renovation, the new station was dedicated on October 16, 2007.

Station layout

Notable places nearby
 Lakewood
 Kirby Company
 Phantasy Theater
 St. Edward High School

Gallery

References

External links

Red Line (RTA Rapid Transit)
Railway stations in the United States opened in 1955
1955 establishments in Ohio